"Back Chat", written by the bass guitarist John Deacon, is the track most influenced by funk on the 1982 Queen album Hot Space. The song is a prime example of how Deacon was strongly pulling the band into dance orientated genres such as R&B, disco, and funk. It reached #40 on the UK Singles Chart, #18 in South Africa and a #19 entry in Ireland.

The track was performed on the Hot Space Tour at a faster tempo, with a more rock-oriented arrangement. "Back Chat", the title, is an English idiom referring to "impertinent or impudent replies, especially to a superior". In a Rolling Stone album review, critic John Milward described the musical style of the song as: "a hot rock-funk tune, with guitar tracks as slick as an icy dance floor."

It is thought that the song may have been written by Deacon as a response to the amount of input of guitarist Brain May on most Queen songs, this is potentially evidenced with after the lyric “And you always get your way” is sung the bulk of guitar follows.

In 2022 Far Out magazine named the song as one of the 40 best songs released in 1982 alongside such songs as Come On Eileen and 1999.

Track listings 
7" Single

A Side. "Back Chat" (Single Version) - 4:10

B Side. "Staying Power" - 4:10

12" Single

A Side. "Back Chat" (Extended Version) - 6:55

B Side. "Staying Power" - 4:10

Personnel

Freddie Mercury - lead and backing vocals
Brian May - guitar solos
Roger Taylor - electronic drums
John Deacon - bass guitar, rhythm guitar, lead guitar, synthesizer, drum machine

Chart performance

References

External links
 Official YouTube videos: original music video, Live at The Bowl
 Lyrics at Queen official website

Queen (band) songs
1982 songs
1982 singles
Songs written by John Deacon
Song recordings produced by Reinhold Mack
EMI Records singles
Elektra Records singles
Hollywood Records singles
Funk rock songs